James A. Smith (born 14 April 1958) is an English musician, best known as the bass guitarist for the rock band Cardiacs which he formed with his brother Tim Smith. Along with performing backing vocals for the group, he co-wrote the hymn "The Alphabet Business Concern (Home of Fadeless Splendour)", sang lead vocals on "Food on the Wall" live, and his girlfriend ran the band's merch stall.

Smith grew up in Chessington, Surrey, purchasing a bass in 1972. He co-founded the band that would become Cardiacs, Cardiac Arrest, in 1977 on bass and backing vocals, though he allegedly couldn't play an instrument. Co-writing the lyrics on the cassette album Toy World (1981), Smith played on every Cardiacs release and, along with Tim, was the only constant member in the band's regularly changing lineup. He became popular and was often bullied by his brother on stage during Cardiacs performances, with the band purportedly formed to punish him for the unkind things he would do to Tim as an infant.

Following Tim Smith's death in 2020, Jim wrote a funeral notice and released the single "Vermin Mangle" with Cardiacs before performing a new version of the song "Tarred and Feathered" with members of Napalm Death, Voivod and Municipal Waste in 2021. He remains the only founding member of Cardiacs still in the band.

Early life 
James A. Smith was born in Carshalton, Surrey on 14 April 1958. He grew up in a Chessington house with his mother Eileen and his younger brother Tim who was born three years later. Known as 'Jim', Smith purchased a bass guitar to play a blues riff in around 1972 and played with Tim on snare drum according to the official Cardiacs history. His brother attended Fleetwood Secondary School in Chessington, Surrey, with future Cardiacs members Colvin Mayers, Mark Cawthra and Peter Tagg. Tim briefly played bass in his first guitar experiments, before the task was passed to Jim.

Career 
Smith realised that music could become his life from the momentum of do it yourself punk. He co-founded the band that would become Cardiacs, Cardiac Arrest, with Tim in 1977. The brothers were the only constant members in the band's regularly changing lineup. Jim played bass guitar and backing vocals, though he allegedly couldn't play an instrument. According to Cardiacs' official history, Tim intended to make him "look as foolish as possible on stage" to punish him "for all the unkind things he would do to him as an infant". On Cardiac Arrest's first album, the cassette-only release The Obvious Identity (1980), Jim was credited as "Patty Pilf". His first writing credit came on the second Cardiacs cassette, Toy World (1981), co-writing the album's lyrics with Tim and Cawthra. In live shows, Jim sang lead vocals on the song "Food on the Wall", a B-side of the band's debut single "A Bus for a Bus on the Bus" (1979).

On Cardiacs' 1992 album Heaven Born and Ever Bright, Smith co-wrote the opening track "The Alphabet Business Concern (Home of Fadeless Splendour)" with Tim as an overwrought choral tribute to the band's own record label. The hymn was often used to open shows, during which a taciturn Jim would recurringly be bullied by his brother, getting hit violently around the head. Tim would goad him over his weight, announcing during gigs that it would be their last because Jim was "too fat" and "going to die". Jim would reportedly get revenge by hiding Tim's hi-fi and TV in the local pond wrapped in bin bags. Jim became popular, with crowds chanting his name during concerts. His girlfriend, Jane Pannell, ran the band's merch stall.

Smith also played in the band Katherine in a Cupboard (alternatively spelt "Catherine") with Cardiacs drummer Bob Leith. Their song "Building Cakes" was included on the compilation Cardiacs and Affectionate Friends (2001) to promote an upcoming album which has yet to be released.

Tim Smith was awarded an Honorary Degree as Doctor of Music from the Royal Conservatoire of Scotland in 2018, which Jim received in his stead, confessing to the head Registrar that he "felt like a fraud, and it was all probably a mistake." Jim announced Tim's death in July 2020 on the Cardiacs website, saying "my dearest brother Tim passed away suddenly last night. Sorry it’s a brief message but I don’t have it in me to speak at length just now". He wrote a funeral notice for Tim, releasing the song "Vermin Mangle" with Cardiacs the same day.

A one-off supergroup comprising members of Napalm Death, Voivod, Municipal Waste, Child Bite and Yakuza joined forces with Smith to record a new version of the song "Tarred and Feathered" from Big Ship (1987) in remembrance of Tim. Jim, who looked sad, bored and unsmiling with Cardiacs, smiled in the video.

Musical style and equipment 

In 2007, The Dreaded Press described Smith live as "a rather grumpy looking bald fellow who has the caricature air of taxman who knows there's been a serious evasion but who can't locate it in the books." Smith's bass guitar has been called "effortlessly brilliant". He played a Rickenbacker bass, specifically a Rickenbacker 4001 in multiple concert appearances and the "Tarred and Feathered" music video.

Discography 

Cardiacs songs Smith wrote:

 "A Cake for Bertie's Party" from "A Bus for a Bus on the Bus" (co-written with Tim Smith and Colvin Mayers)

 "The Alphabet Business Concern (Home of Fadeless Splendour)" from Heaven Born and Ever Bright (co-written with Tim Smith)
 All lyrics on Toy World (with Tim Smith and Mark Cawthra)
With Katherine in a Cupboard:

 "Building Cakes" (credited to Catherine in a Cupboard) from Cardiacs and Affectionate Friends (written by Bob Leith and Gary McGuiness; arranged by Dave Murder)

References

Sources

External links
 
 

1958 births
Living people
English rock bass guitarists
English songwriters
People from Surrey
Cardiacs members
Musicians from Surrey